Hosted by the UAE Ministry of Energy and based in Dubai, Middle East Energy is the leading international trade event for the power industry, covering the generation, transmission and distribution of electricity, storage & management of energy and the lighting industry. The event is held at Dubai World Trade Centre in the United Arab Emirates. Organised by Informa Exhibitions, Middle East Electricity is partnered with Electricx in Egypt and Power Nigeria in Lagos.

The exhibition
The exhibition is held under the patronage of Sheikh Maktoum bin Mohammed bin Rashid Al Maktoum, Deputy Ruler of Dubai. Exhibitors include large industrial companies, municipalities, building contractors, electrical retailers, electro-mechanical contractors, dealers and distributors, municipalities, government bodies, oil and gas companies, equipment manufactures, power producers, utility companies, power plant operators, power producers and power generation companies.

The exhibition also features an award ceremony - the Middle East Energy Awards and a diverse range of educational opportunities including professional workshops, product focused technical seminars and a high level conference.

Awards 
The Middle East Electricity Awards takes place on the opening night of the event at a gala dinner and covers nine individual categories:

 Power Project of the Year
 Lighting Project of the Year
 Solar Project of the Year
 Best Innovation or Technology of the Year
 HSE Project of the Year
 Young Engineer of the Year
 Power & Water Utility of the Year
 Best Marketing Campaign Award (exhibitor award)
 Best Product Launch at MEE (exhibitor award)

References

External links
 Middle East Energy Official Site
 Informa Exhibitions Official Site

Trade fairs in Dubai